Furanomycin is an isoleucine antagonist.

References

Amino acids
Dihydrofurans